T. americanus may refer to:
 Tetrapus americanus, a wasp species
 Tomistoma americanus, an extinct crocodile species in the genus Tomistoma
 Typhlodromus americanus, a mite species in the genus Typhlodromus

See also
 Americanus (disambiguation)